Achagua or Axagua may refer to:
 Achagua people, an ethnic group of Colombia and Venezuela
 Achagua language, a language of Colombia
 Achagua (moth), a geometer moth genus of the tribe Nacophorini

See also
 Achaguas (disambiguation)
 Xagua (disambiguation)